Azma (Arabic: عَزْم‎ (ʕazm)) is a surname of Arabic origin. Notable people with the surname are as follows:

Bashir al-Azma (1910–1992), Syrian doctor and politician
Bilal Said Al-Azma (born 1955), Saudi Arabian sprinter
Mehran Azma, known as R. Barrows, American musician
Nabih al-Azma (1886–1964), Syrian politician 
Yasser al-Azma (born 1942), Syrian writer and actor
Yusuf al-Azma (1883–1920), Syrian politician

Surnames of Syrian origin